Monona Terrace (officially the Monona Terrace Community and Convention Center) is a convention center on the shores of Lake Monona in Madison, Wisconsin.

Controversy

Originally designed by Wisconsin native Frank Lloyd Wright, it was first proposed by Wright in 1938. The county board rejected the plan by a single vote.  Wright would continue to seek support for the plan (and alter its design) until his death in 1959.

For the next four decades, various proposals for a convention center on the Monona Terrace land would be considered and rejected.  Several times, it appeared that supporters of the project would be able to secure the public financing to complete the project, but various forces (such as the start of World War II) inevitably sidelined the plan. In 1990, Madison Mayor Paul Soglin resurrected Wright's proposal. Among the arguments against its construction, opponents argued that it was not a genuine Wright building, that the costs were too steep for the tax payers to bear and that the construction would adversely affect the environment, specifically destroying the view of Lake Monona from street level on the south side of the Capitol Square. Additionally, the site of the land stands on historic Ho-Chunk Nation burial mounds. The proposed construction was put to a public referendum in 1992 and it passed. Construction began two years later.

In 1997, nearly sixty years after Wright's original conception, Monona Terrace Community and Convention Center opened its doors.

Location

Monona Terrace is located two blocks from the Wisconsin State Capitol building in downtown Madison.

From the roof of Monona Terrace, one can see views of downtown Madison, including the Capitol and a panoramic view of Lake Monona.

Design

Wright made several alterations to the design of Monona Terrace during his lifetime.  Although the exterior design is Wright's, the interior as executed was designed by former Wright apprentice Anthony Puttnam of Taliesin Associated Architects.

Construction

The building was constructed by J.H. Findorff and Son Inc., a southern Wisconsin contractor.

Facilities

The facility hosts over 600 conventions, meetings and weddings each year that result in an average of $52 million in economic activity for the region.  Monona Terrace also runs free community programs that serve approximately 56,000 people each year.  Monona Terrace also offers guided tours, a gift shop, a rooftop cafe (warm weather months only), and serves as the home for some of the community's events including the national radio variety show Michael Feldman's Whad'Ya Know?, Dane Dances, Ironman Wisconsin, and U.S. Bank Eve.

Gallery

References

External links

Photographed in HDR

Frank Lloyd Wright buildings
Convention centers in Wisconsin
Buildings and structures in Madison, Wisconsin
Buildings and structures completed in 1997
Tourist attractions in Madison, Wisconsin
1997 establishments in Wisconsin
Event venues established in 1997